The Resources and Energy Sector Infrastructure Council (RESIC) was created by the State Government of South Australia in 2007 to support the development of future infrastructure projects. It was a small group of senior executives selected to represent the industry and public sector's leaders. The council facilitates close working relationships between private and public sectors on infrastructure planning and development matters and aims to foster cooperation between companies to maximize the value of proposed infrastructure and minimize unnecessary duplication.

RESIC initiated a Resource and Energy Infrastructure Demand Study in 2011, which led to the development of a Regional Mining and Infrastructure Plan, prepared by Deloitte. The plan recommended the establishment of a Resource Infrastructure Taskforce (RIT).

In 2015, RESIC merged with the Resources Industry Development Board (RIDB), forming the Minerals and Energy Advisory Council.

2014 members

Membership as of October 2014:
 Tino Guglielmo, Stuart Petroleum
 Bruce Carter, Ferrier Hodgson
 John Roberts, South Australian Chamber of Mines & Energy
 Jason Kuchel, South Australian Chamber of Mines & Energy
 David Cruickshanks-Boyd, Parsons Brinckerhoff
 Paul Heithersay, PIRSA
 Darryl Cuzzubbo, BHP Billiton

Former members 

Past members of RESIC include the following:
 Paul J Dowd, Phoenix Copper
 Hans Umlauff, Iluka Resources
 Jim White, OneSteel & Centrex Metals
 Jim Hallion, Department of Transport, Energy & Infrastructure
 Brian Cunningham, Department of Trade & Economic Development
 Rod Hook, Department of Transport, Energy & Infrastructure
 Dean Dalla Valle, BHP Billiton
 Lewis Owens, Country Arts Trust & SA Water
 Merrill Gray, Syngas Limited
 Lance Worrall, Department Trade and Economic Development
 Trish White, Worley Parsons
 Mick Wilkes, Oz Minerals
 Reg Nelson, Beach Petroleum
 Raymond Garrand, Government of South Australia

References

Further reading
 

Advisory boards of the Government of South Australia
Energy infrastructure in Australia